

Kinor 16 CX series Cine Camera 
The Kinor prototype was created in 1965 by the MKBK, or Moskinap, manual narrow-film apparatus 16СХ of the original design [2] . However, large-scale production was established only ten years after the modernization. Two versions were produced: the turret "Kinor" 16СХ-1М with a revolving head for three interchangeable lenses, and 16СХ-2М, designed for one interchangeable lens. The cameras were intended for synchronous filming of television plots, since video cameras for television journalism did not yet exist in the USSR . Unlike the turret model, which was equipped with an shutter with an adjustable opening angle, the shutter of the 16CX-2M model was non-adjustable, which simplified the design and made it more reliable [3]... The last model was equipped with a tenfold professional 16OPF1-2M-01 zoom lens with a focal length range of 12–120 mm and a wide-angle lens of 10 mm. The other configuration included a 16OPF12-1s varifocal lens and a 0.75 × wide-angle attachment . The device made it possible to use the majority of cinematographic lenses in a standard frame, including those from old-style Krasnogorsk cameras with a bayonet mount . On the basis of the 16СХ family, a tripod-shoulder synchronous camera 2СР was developed with a built-in device for recording an audio on the magnetic track of a film.

Technical data

Brief Details 
The 16mm Kinor 1M has a turret-type lens mounting and a variable shutter. The 2M and the rare 3M models are supplied with a 10-100 zoom lens, which has front- and rear-mountable filters. The usual kit consists of four magazines, three 100-foot, and one 400-foot. Synchronized sound is achieved using a sync-pulse known as a pilot tone, and the motor generates an accurate 25 frames per second to attain this. Variable frame rates require a relatively cheap modification form third-party developers, or the factory-produced variable drive unit. This is very quickly and simply replaced. It is common to see this type of modification coupled with the addition of true crystal-sync.

The cameras’ use in the West is gaining popularity as filmmakers grow accustomed to Russian manufacturing quality. Compared with the Krasnogorsk series of Russian cameras, the build quality is of a higher standard, although these too are  well-designed units. Their price compared with the benchmark Arri series film cameras is drastically cheaper; this is partly the reason new filmmakers are finding themselves the owners of these very practical film cameras.

The 35-millimeter Kinors are self-blimped and have been used to make films worldwide.

There is a wide range of LOMO lenses produced for the Kinor 16.

Prime lenses are 
 16 OKS 1-6-1 f/1.8 6 mm
 16 OKS 3-10-1 f/2.1 10 mm
 16 OKS 3-15-1 f/2 15 mm
 16 OKS 2-20-1 f/1.9 20 mm
 16 OKS 1-25-1 f/2.5 25 mm
 16 OKS 8-35-1 f/2 35 mm
 16 OKS 1-50-6 f/2 50 mm
 16 OKS 1-75-1 f/2 75 mm
 16 OKS 1-100-1 f/2 100 mm
 16 OKS 1-150-1 f/2.8 150 mm
 16 OKS 7-200-1 f/2.8 200 mm
 16 OKS 6-300-1 f/3.5 300 mm

Zoom lenses are 
 16 OPF 12-1 f/2.5 10–100 mm
 16 OPF 1-2M-01 f/2.4 12-120mm

and a wide angle adapter which attaches to both lenses which lends a 7.5–75 mm range to the 16 OPF 12-1 and a 9–90 mm range to the 16 OPF 1-2M-01.

Technical Details 
The 16SX-2M apparatus was equipped with a one-sided single-tooth grab with a single-tooth counter- grab and a lower-mounted mirror shutter with a constant opening angle [3] . The design made it possible to shoot on film with both one-sided and double-sided perforation . Quick-change magazine type cassettes with a capacity of 30 and 120 meters were designed for film rolls wound on standard cores 16 × 50 [4] .  Daylight 100 ft spools could be placed in the magazine by removing the "platters", as per the image to the right.  It seems commonly recommend not to use metal spools as if they rub against the inside of the magazine, audio recording might be difficult.

The view finder with a magnification of 9.5 × , equipped with a diopter adjustment, could rotate 360 ° in one plane without compensating for the image rotation [4] . The rotation of the magnifier provided comfortable sighting at low or excessively high positions of the apparatus, but at the same time the observed image was rotated at an angle corresponding to the rotation of the magnifier. In addition to turning, the magnifier could be pulled out of the housing for adjustment to the operator's left eye. Focusing was carried out according to the image on frosted glass or distance scales on the lenses.

The design of the drive is removable, which made it possible to use various types. The main DC electric drive 29EPSS was powered by a block of 8 SCS-5 batteries, carried on the operator's shoulder, and was designed for 25 frames per second [5] . Additionally, 28EPSS drives were produced with a wider range of 8–64 frames per second, and AC (power point) powered drives 10EPS and 11EPS, designed for 24 and 25 frames per second, respectively [3] . All drives are equipped with a "pilot-tone" , which provided synchronization to a recording device to record synchronous audio[4]... "Kinor" 16СХ-2М had a low noise level of the mechanism 42 dB and was suitable for synchronous shooting [1] .  In modern usage, a 12 volt motorcycle battery would commonly supply ample charge to run a Kinor camera.  Higher fps speeds may require a higher watt battery output.

With the advent of portable video cameras, which were more convenient than filming devices in television production, the 16 mm Kinor series cameras were replaced by them. Currently, there are improved versions of these devices, equipped with TVs, PL mount and digitally controlled electric drives. There are also devices with an enlarged frame window, adapted to the " Super-16 " format [3] .

References 
 ↑ 1 2 Salomatin, 1990, p. 21.
 ↑ V.V. Perepichai, V.F. Gordeev, O. N. Raev. Special equipment for filming processes  (rus.)  // "World of cinema technology": magazine. - 2008. - No. 10 . - S. 30 . - ISSN 1991-3400 .
 ↑ 1 2 3 4 5 Website of cinema and video equipment of the XX century .
 ↑ 1 2 3 Gordiychuk, 1979, p. 122.
 ↑ Whitepaper, 1975, p. 27.

External links
  Kinor Digital Cinema 
 Konvas and Kinor 35mm Cinema Cameras
KINOR 16 CX-2M. The best 16mm Russian movie camera. ... blogspot.com. Retrieved June 24, 2011. Archived May 14, 2012.
Series "Kinor-16" . Cinema cameras 16mm . Site of cinema and video equipment of the XX century. Retrieved September 14, 2012. Archived October 26, 2012.
Kinor 16 CX-1M/2M English user manual
Kinor 16 CX-1M/2M Original Russian user manual
Kinor 16 CX-2M modern "Using the Kinor 16" guide
Olex Services -qualified cine camera technician speacialised in Russian Cine cameras, 16mm & 35mm
Kinor 16 CX-2M D.I.Y service and repair
Kinor 16 CX-2M Blog  -Interesting website detailing commercials shot with a Kinor 16mm
Vintage Russian Lenses  -Interesting website detailing the current fascination with Russian made lenses
Lomo Lenses  -Interesting website, a buying guide for Lomo lenses

Literature 
 S. A. Salomatin, I. B. Artishevskaya, O. F. Grebennikov. 1.2. The history of the development of filming equipment in the USSR. // Professional filming equipment. - 1st ed .. - L .: Mechanical Engineering, 1990. - P. 23. - 288 p. - ISBN 5-217-00900-4 .
 Gordiychuk O. F., Pell V. G. Section II. Filming devices // Handbook of cameraman / NN Zherdetskaya. - M .: "Art", 1979. - S. 68–142. - 440 p.
 Cinematographic device "Kinor" 16СХ-М. Technical description and instruction manual . - M.,: MKBK, 1975 .-- 40 p.

Technology companies of Russia
Russian brands
Soviet cameras